"Come In, Your Time is Up" is the fourth episode of the eighth series of the British situation comedy Dad's Army. It was originally broadcast on Friday, 26 September 1975.

Synopsis
Mainwairing's platoon discovers a German aircrew in an inflatable dinghy on a lake. Pike suggests they shoot through the dinghy and sink them, but his Captain reminds him about "being a sporting nation and playing with a straight bat". Wilson comes up with a more civilised strategy, but Pike remains poised with his gun, just in case.

Plot
Because of a double-booking, the platoon are forced to use the Vicar's Garden for a parade. However Mainwaring's attempts to give them a serious lecture on fieldcraft, are interrupted by the persistent concerns of Mr Blewitt. As Mainwaring tries to demonstrate the use of the platoons new bivouac tents, and the best way to eat a hedgehog, Mr Blewitt objects to their "improper" use of the Vicar's Garden. The scene ends with the platoon almost accidentally setting fire to the lawn.

The following weekend the platoon are in the countryside to try out their bivouac tents. To Mainwaring's annoyance, the Chief Warden's van appears as he has brought out the Sea Scouts for a camp of their own. This will interfere with the platoon's male bonding, as "comrades under the stars", and he suspects Hodges has brought them to that specific spot to deliberately upset him. The joke is on Hodges, however, when he runs out of petrol and is forced to spend the night out there as well.

In the night, a Nazi plane appears overhead on fire, and they get up with their rifles. However, there is nothing they can do about it, and go back to bed. The following morning, they spot three Nazi pilots floating on a rubber dinghy in the middle of the nearby lake, clearly having bailed out of the plane the previous night. Requisitioning the Sea Scouts boat, Mainwaring and his men go out to parley with the pilots, using Hodges as an interpreter because of his knowledge of German. Their efforts meet ridicule and the Germans do not surrender, and instead laugh when Hodges falls in the water. It appears the Germans are waiting for nightfall so they can slip ashore, and escape.

Knowing that they cannot shoot men with their hands up, the platoon come up with an elaborate plan involving Jones swimming underwater and bursting the dinghy with his bayonet. With predictably disastrous results, the plan goes wrong, and Hodges once again falls into the water. This time he is taken prisoner by the German raft, who then proceed to open fire on the British boat. An angry Mainwaring draws his pistol and orders his own men to "Let 'em have it men!", but Wilson points out they will hit Hodges.

Pike comes to the rescue, firing a number of arrows into the dinghy, causing it to start sinking. At last the Germans, realising the game is up, try to surrender. Mainwaring shouts out to Hodges "ask the Germans if they can swim" to which Hodges replies "never mind them! I'm the one who can't swim!"

Cast
Arthur Lowe as Captain Mainwaring
John Le Mesurier as Sergeant Wilson
Clive Dunn as Lance Corporal Jones
John Laurie as Private Frazer
Arnold Ridley as Private Godfrey
Ian Lavender as Private Pike
Bill Pertwee as ARP Warden Hodges
Frank Williams as The Vicar
Edward Sinclair as The Verger
Harold Bennett as Mr. Blewitt
Colin Bean as Private Sponge

Dad's Army (series 8) episodes
1975 British television episodes